Higher Brothers are a Chinese hip hop group from Chengdu consisting of four members: MaSiWei (马思唯 Siwei Ma), KnowKnow (丁震 Zhen Ding), Psy.P (杨俊逸 Junyi Yang), and Melo (谢宇杰 Yujie Xie).  The group is known for their songs in Standard Mandarin and Sichuan Dialect, such as "Made in China", "Black Cab" and "WeChat".

History

Origins 
Higher Brothers are part of the much larger rap collective Chengdu Rap House (成都说唱会馆), also known as CDC (an abbreviation of Chengdu City), which was formed in the early 2010s. Melo, who was the earliest of the Higher Brothers to join the Rap House, performed in a cypher video in 2012 alongside original Rap House members such as Fat Shady and Sleepy Cat.
Meanwhile, Masiwei began rapping around 2013 and he was called OG Skippy, releasing three solo mixtapes in 2013, 2014, and 2015 , and Melo and Psy.P performed as a duo called 天地会 (TianDi Clan, or TDC), releasing a mixtape in 2015.

In 2015, DZknow, who had recently arrived from Nanjing, released a song with Masiwei and Psy.P called "Haier Brothers" (海爾兄弟) after the old logo of the Chinese electronics company Haier, which features a pair of brothers. After the song received a positive reception, the members decided to form a group and name it after the song. Over time, the English form of the name became "Higher Brothers". The group's music is inspired by 50 Cent, A$AP Rocky, Kendrick Lamar, J. Cole and Migos.

The quick cycles of media consumerism in China allowed the Higher Brothers to enter the underground Chinese hip-hop scene and explode in popularity within a matter of months, and their international success would soon follow after signing with multinational label 88rising.

88rising and international success 
The Higher Brothers joined 88rising in 2016 and are managed by Sean Miyashiro and Lana Larkin. Larkin also appeared on a few of their tracks. The group first appeared on 88rising's YouTube channel in 2016 with the song "Black Cab". A video published by 88rising shows prominent hip-hop figures like Kyle, Lil' Yachty, Migos, and Playboi Carti reacting extremely positively to Higher Brothers' hit music video "Made in China" skyrocketed their popularity and helped push them into the public eye internationally. The video currently has over 22 million views. The Higher Brothers also appeared in both Adidas Originals and Beats by Dre commercials, and were involved in a photo shoot with Russel Westbrook to promote the opening of a Jordan flagship store in Shanghai.

Due to the success of songs like "Made in China" and "Franklin", the Higher Brothers embarked on a tour through Asia alongside 88rising artists Joji and Rich Brian in late 2017. In 2018 the group embarked on their North American Tour "Journey to the West", named after their EP of the same name which was released in January 2018. The group released their second album Five Stars in 2019, and embarked on their worldwide "Wish You Rich" tour starting May 2019. At the end of 2019 the group announced that each member would release a solo album. DZknow released his album Mr. Enjoy Da Money on December 12, 2019, and also started a street wear brand of the same name. On February 28, 2020, MaSiWei released his solo album Prince Charming, named after the 1999 movie of the same name. Melo's solo album Old Master came out in April 2020 and revolved around the theme of paying homage to old guard rappers. Psy.P released his album PSYLIFE.25 in May 2020, featuring the singles "Chanel", "Tongzilin" and "Bad Habits".

Band members 

These are Chinese names; surnames appear first.

MaSiWei, b.1993 (马思唯, Mǎ Sīwéi, also known as Ma Shi [马师] lit. "Master Ma", formerly known as OG Skippy), group leader, from Pixian, Chengdu.
MaSiWei was into hip-hop from a young age, and cites inspirations such as 50 Cent and his album Get Rich or Die Tryin' (2003). He joined the CDC in 2013. In 2021, because of issues of 88rising published his song "Lazy Suzan" with 21 Savage, Rich Brian and Warren Hue in "Shang-Chi", he left 88rising and Made his own label A Few Good Kids Records, which includes YOUNG13DBABY, Fendighee Ricch, YTH Money Gang, CashTrippy and ATM Hanson.
 DZknow, b.1996 (丁震, Dīng Zhèn, also known as KnowKnow or simply DZ), from Nanjing.
DZknow had several aspirations as an adolescent, most notably wanting to be an astronaut. His hip-hop inspirations came from Usher's song "Yeah!". He became connected to the rest of the group through Weibo, when he purchased a beat from MaSiWei.
He also left 88rising because the contract was over
 Psy.P, b.1994 (杨俊逸, Yáng Jùnyì) from Chengdu.
Psy P.'s hip-hop interest came from T.I. and Lil' Wayne, both prominent figures in rap around the time he joined the CDC in 2011, before becoming a joint act with Melo.
he left 88rising and joined RYCE, the company  signed because the album Chengdu Hot was delayed.
 Melo, b.1994 (谢宇杰, Xiè Yǔjié) from Chengdu.
Melo had aspirations of being a professional footballer in China before joining the CDC in 2011.
He is still in 88rising since the contract wasn't over.

Discography

Mixtape: Higher Brothers 
The group released a mixtape in 2016 entitled Higher Brothers Mixtape. It consists of 19 tracks including the "original" versions of two songs also featured on Black Cab - "7/11" and "WeChat". The original version of "7/11" featured a beat that was produced by Deko, while "Wechat" used the beat from Speaker Knockerz's song "Count Up". These beats were most likely changed for the re-released versions due to copyright concerns.

Debut album: Black Cab
Their debut album Black Cab was released on May 31, 2017. It features collaborations with Keith Ape, Famous Dex, Jay Park and more. The album was named for the unlicensed black cab drivers of the group's native Chengdu. Despite its success, the album is almost entirely in Sichuanese, which made it almost unintelligible for a majority of Chinese listeners. It features songs from the groups pre-88rising days, as well as new songs written after signing with the label. The album contains the Higher Brother's song "Made In China", which Noisey describes as their "most famous track to date". The video for the song went viral, receiving over 15 million views as of March 2019.

EP: Journey To The West
Higher Brothers released a new EP on January 17, 2018, during their North American tour with the same name accompanied by other artists from 88rising. There are four tracks in the EP, one of them being "Flo Rida". Originally just a single before the official announcement of the rest of the Journey to the West EP, the song blends both the Chinese and English languages. The song is produced by Florida rapper and producer Smokepurpp and features Ski Mask the Slump God. The EP is named after the popular Chinese novel of the same name.

Second album: Five Stars

The group released their second album Five Stars on February 22, 2019. It features collaborations with American rappers, like Soulja Boy, Ski Mask the Slump God, Denzel Curry and many more.

Significance

Culturally 
The Higher Brothers became part of a wider phenomenon in China that ventured from the traditional ways of the past generation. For many in the younger generation in China, the cutthroat housing market and job and marriage markets are extremely competitive and present a lot of obstacles for young Chinese. Higher Brothers are the first Chinese rap group to achieve international recognition, rivaling the overseas popularity of Chinese pop stars like Jackson Wang and Lay Zhang.

The group has been able to circumvent Chinese censorship, believed largely due to the unmet need in cultural product of exportable quality. In an older song, Melo rapped "I don't write political hip-hop. But if any politicians try to shut me up, I'll cut off their heads and lay them at their corpses' feet." This line caused him to be brought into the Public Security Bureau for further questioning, but he was ultimately let go.

Musically 
The Higher Brothers bring energy and crowd involvement into their performances through multilingual integration of their music: speaking to the crowd in mandarin while rapping in English, Mandarin, and Sichuanese. This kind of higher level participation from the crowd was largely unseen in the hip-hop scene during the Higher Brothers' come up, but has since become more prevalent.
Higher Brothers stopped working as a band in 2020 since they have issues or problems with the label, 88rising. But they still collaborate on artist's individual albums

References

Further reading 
 https://radiichina.com/higher-brothers/
 http://www.papermag.com/meet-the-higher-brothers-the-rap-group-climbing-over-the-great-firewal-2441103073.html
 https://pitchfork.com/thepitch/1537-inside-88rising-the-company-behind-rich-chigga-and-his-asian-rap-comrades/
 https://nylon.com/articles/nylon-guys-higher-brothers-september-2017
 http://www.scmp.com/magazines/post-magazine/arts-music/article/2104299/chengdu-rap-crew-higher-brothers-show-their
 http://www.passionweiss.com/2017/05/18/higher-brothers/
 https://www.npr.org/event/music/531741521/watch-higher-brothers-the-chinese-migos-flex-like-franklin

Chinese hip hop groups
Singers from Chengdu
Chinese rappers
Chinese music
Living people
Mandarin-language albums
Musicians from Sichuan
Asian hip hop
Year of birth missing (living people)
Chinese boy bands
21st-century Chinese male singers